In abstract algebra, an abelian group  is called finitely generated if there exist finitely many elements  in  such that every  in  can be written in the form  for some integers .

Every finite abelian group is finitely generated. The finitely generated abelian groups can be completely classified.

Examples
 The integers, are a finitely generated abelian group.
 Any direct sum of finitely many finitely generated abelian groups is again a finitely generated abelian group.
 Every lattice forms a finitely generated free abelian group.

There are no other examples (up to isomorphism). The group  of non-zero rational numbers is also not finitely generated. The groups of real numbers under addition  and non-zero real numbers under multiplication  are also not finitely generated.

Classification
The fundamental theorem of finitely generated abelian groups can be stated two ways, generalizing the two forms of the fundamental theorem of finite abelian groups. The theorem, in both forms, in turn generalizes to the structure theorem for finitely generated modules over a principal ideal domain, which in turn admits further generalizations.

Primary decomposition
The primary decomposition formulation states that every finitely generated abelian group G is isomorphic to a direct sum of primary cyclic groups and infinite cyclic groups. A primary cyclic group is one whose order is a power of a prime. That is, every finitely generated abelian group is isomorphic to a group of the form

where n ≥ 0 is the rank, and the numbers q1, ..., qt are powers of (not necessarily distinct) prime numbers. In particular, G is finite if and only if n = 0.  The values of n, q1, ..., qt are (up to rearranging the indices) uniquely determined by G, that is, there is one and only one way to represent G as such a decomposition.

The proof of this statement uses the basis theorem for finite abelian group: every finite abelian group is a direct sum of primary cyclic groups. Denote the torsion subgroup of G as tG. Then, G/tG is a torsion-free abelian group and thus it is free abelian. tG is a direct summand of G, which means there exists a subgroup F of G s.t. , where . Then, F is also free abelian. Since tG is finitely generated and each element of tG has finite order, tG is finite. By the basis theorem for finite abelian group, tG can be written as direct sum of primary cyclic groups.

Invariant factor decomposition
We can also write any finitely generated abelian group G as a direct sum of the form

where k1 divides k2, which divides k3 and so on up to ku.  Again, the rank n and the invariant factors k1, ..., ku are uniquely determined by G (here with a unique order).  The rank and the sequence of invariant factors determine the group up to isomorphism.

Equivalence
These statements are equivalent as a result of the Chinese remainder theorem, which implies that  if and only if j and k are coprime.

History
The history and credit for the fundamental theorem is complicated by the fact that it was proven when group theory was not well-established, and thus early forms, while essentially the modern result and proof, are often stated for a specific case.

Group theorist László Fuchs states:

This generalized an earlier result of Carl Friedrich Gauss from Disquisitiones Arithmeticae (1801), which classified quadratic forms; Kronecker cited this result of Gauss's. The theorem was stated and proved in the language of groups by Ferdinand Georg Frobenius and Ludwig Stickelberger in 1878. Another group-theoretic formulation was given by Kronecker's student Eugen Netto in 1882.

This was done in the context of computing the
homology of a complex, specifically the Betti number and torsion coefficients of a dimension of the complex, where the Betti number corresponds to the rank of the free part, and the torsion coefficients correspond to the torsion part.

Corollaries
Stated differently the fundamental theorem says that a finitely generated abelian group is the direct sum of a free abelian group of finite rank and a finite abelian group, each of those being unique up to isomorphism. The finite abelian group is just the torsion subgroup of G. The rank of G is defined as the rank of the torsion-free part of G; this is just the number n in the above formulas.

A corollary to the fundamental theorem is that every finitely generated torsion-free abelian group is free abelian. The finitely generated condition is essential here:  is torsion-free but not free abelian.

Every subgroup and factor group of a finitely generated abelian group is again finitely generated abelian. The finitely generated abelian groups, together with the group homomorphisms, form an abelian category which is a Serre subcategory of the category of abelian groups.

Non-finitely generated abelian groups

See also
 The composition series in the Jordan–Hölder theorem is a non-abelian generalization.

Notes

References

  Reprinted (pp. 367–409) in The Collected Mathematical Papers of Henry John Stephen Smith, Vol. I, edited by J. W. L. Glaisher. Oxford: Clarendon Press (1894), xcv+603 pp.
 
 

Abelian group theory
Algebraic structures